Aïda Ba (27 June 1983 – 3 October 2022) was a French rugby union player who played at .

Biography
Ba discovered rugby in 2001 and formed the team  while at Sorbonne Paris North University, becoming its first captain. She played for the French national team in the 2007 Women's Six Nations Championship.

Aïda Ba died of breast cancer on 3 October 2022, at the age of 39.

References

1983 births
2022 deaths
Black French sportspeople
Deaths from breast cancer
Deaths from cancer in France
French female rugby union players
Rugby union flankers